Ensto is a Finnish international technology company and a family business, that designs and offers electrical solutions for electricity distribution networks, buildings, marine and electric traffic. Ensto manufactures for example solutions for overhead line- and underground cable networks, luminaires, electric vehicle charging systems, electric heaters, control systems, and enclosing systems.

History

1958–1999
In 1958, 28-year-old Ensio Miettinen established an engineering office by the name “Insinööritoimisto Ensio Miettinen” in Porvoo, Finland. The company started by lathing small metal parts. He studied carefully the market, selecting products that did not suit large competitors, and was able to target, without exceptions, some particular market niche with his products. His father had wished that he should be an entrepreneur: “Set up a hotdog stand if you like, but don’t go working for someone else!” Already during his student days starting at the age of 22, Miettinen had managed things at his father’s engineering firm, Puristustuote Oy. There he had noticed that strong demand existed in Finland for the manufacture of small electrical supplies in particular. He also understood that, instead of individual products, he needed to concentrate on electrical systems. In seven years, Ensto grew larger than Miettinen's father’s enterprise.

Miettinen led his company by observing the environment – particularly the German market – as well as by reading a lot and taking conscious risks.

During the 1970s, the enterprise began its internationalization and expanded its product range: in 1972 Sähkövaruste Ab was acquired; in 1973, subsidiary Ensto Elektriska AB was founded in Sweden; and in 1974, a factory making distribution boards was completed in Mikkeli and a large industrial hall was built in Porvoo.  Ensio Miettinen worked as Managing Director of Ensto Group until 1978, when he hired his successor, Esko Kahela.

In the 1980s, Ensto extended its operations particularly in the Nordic countries, but also in the Far East. It widened its production into, among other things, airport landing lighting systems, electric heating systems, and industrial ceramics. A new plant was constructed in Porvoo, and industrial robots were taken into use. The heaviest and most monotonous work were automated, while the employees were not dismissed. Ensto carried out electrification projects in, for instance, Iraq, Peru and Malesia. In 1988, Ensto Group comprised 21 electricity companies, and employed over 1,200 people.

During the early 1990s depression in Finland, Ensto reacted strongly: they sold the stock exchange shares they owned, froze all investments, cancelled machinery orders but continued with business acquisitions. In 1993, marketing work was carried out particularly in Russia and the Baltic countries. Assembly work was transferred to Estonia and Hungary, and subsidiaries were established in Russia, Poland and Latvia. In 1994, Timo Miettinen became Ensto’s CEO; two years later he switched to membership on the Board of Directors, and his successor, Petteri Walldén, was nominated.

2000–2009

Ensto had considered listing on the stock exchange during the decade, but gave up the plan in 2001. During the same year, the Miettinen family bought back the shares Sponsor Capital owned (34 per cent) and Seppo Martikainen started as a new CEO.

Ensio Miettinen gave up his shares by the year 2002, whereupon the family business switched to the ownership of his four children. He nevertheless retained his membership on the company’s Board of Directors until 2008 and managed a product development manager with whom he coordinated projects to develop an electrical vehicle charging point.

Ensto’s corporate structure was clarified from 1997 to 2004 when it became a Group and opened new market areas outside the Nordic region. 40% of turnover came from Finland and slightly less than 30% from other Nordic countries.

In 2005, company's products were sold in 82 countries, with operations in 14 countries. Production units were found in Finland, Estonia, Poland and China. There were three business units and the largest one was electrical equipment and systems for buildings (46% of the sales) and the second largest one was products sold for the powerline builders (about one-third). One-fifth of sales came from enclosures.

In 2006, Jukka Koskinen was selected as Ensto’s new CEO. Ensto bought a share of 91% from French Ocor Group, which specializes in pre-assembled electrical installation systems. Ocor’s systems were used, for example, in the electrification of offices and business premises. In 2007, the turnover of Ensto Group was 233 million euros.

The acquisition of Enervent, a Porvoo-based ventilation equipment manufacturer, was finalized in 2009, as well as Estonian IMCO. Enervent’s CEO, Timo Luukkainen started as Ensto's CEO.

2010–present
In 2010 EM Group Oy had forty subsidiaries, operated in 19 countries and employed 1,700 persons. Ensto bought Novexia in France in 2010, French PGEP in 2012, Finnish Alppilux in 2014.

Ensto started a cooperation with Arcteq, which integrated its protection relays with Ensto’s circuit breakers. In 2016, a French manufacturer of surge protectors for electrical distribution networks, Tridelta Parafoudres as well as a minority interest in Arcteq were purchased. Ari Virtanen started as Ensto’s CEO.

In 2017, EM Group, owned by the Miettinen family, was split into three new companies: Tianta, Ensto Invest, and EM Group. In 2018, the majority of the group's ownership was transferred to the third generation, to Ensio Miettinen’s 8 grandchildren.
Hannu Keinänen was appointed to the position of Ensto’s CEO in 2019.

Organization
Ensto’s owner and parent company, Ensto Invest Oy, is owned by the Miettinen family. In 2018, Ensto’s 10 owners were part of Ensto Invest’s Board of Directors. The headquarters of Ensto is in Porvoo, Finland, where the company was founded.

In 2019, Ensto employed approximately 1,600 people in 19 countries in Europe, the United States, and Asia, and it had two business areas:
Ensto Smart Buildings offers electrification, lighting, and EV charging solutions to designers, contractors, construction companies, and real estate owners and facility management.
Ensto Utility Networks offers solutions for network automation, power quality and network monitoring. It also designs and develops the overhead line and underground cable solutions.

Business culture

Esko Kahela, who worked at Ensto as a manager from 1973 to 1993 is the creator of the so-called “Ensto spirit”, in which the goals of the company and employees match each other.

Recognitions
In 1982 Oy Ensio Miettinen Ab got the National Entrepreneur Award in Finland
In 2012 Ensto's EVP charging point EVP won the Red Dot Design Award

References

External links

 

Manufacturing companies of Finland
Porvoo
Electrical engineering companies
Engineering companies of Finland
Family-owned companies